The Rainbow is a 1917 American silent drama film directed by Ralph Dean and starring Dorothy Bernard, Robert Conness and Jack Sherrill.

Cast
 Dorothy Bernard as Cynthia
 Robert Conness as Neil Sumner
 Jack Sherrill as Dick Harcourt
 Eleanor Gist as Ruth Sumner
 Jean Stuart as Betsy
 Marion Adams as Baby Cynthia
 Jean La Motte as Mrs. Palmer
 Jack Hopkins as Hollins
 H. Conway Wingfield as Fellowes

References

Bibliography
 Robert B. Connelly. The Silents: Silent Feature Films, 1910-36, Volume 40, Issue 2. December Press, 1998.

External links
 

1917 films
1917 drama films
1910s English-language films
American silent feature films
Silent American drama films
American black-and-white films
1910s American films